The 1961 UAAP men's basketball tournament was the 24th year of the men's tournament of the University Athletic Association of the Philippines (UAAP)'s basketball championship. Hosted by Far Eastern University, the FEU Tamaraws defeated the UE Warriors in a single game finals taking their sixth overall UAAP men's basketball championship.

Participating schools

Finals
Far Eastern University's five-year long quest for a UAAP basketball diadem came to an end when it trampled University of the East, 105–84, before 8,000 fans at the Rizal Memorial Coliseum.

The Tamaraws, playing headly and steady basketball, swept their title-round engagements to nail down the UAAP flag.

The victory was FEU's first championship since 1956 and its sixth since the loop was born in 1938. UE deprived the Tamaraws the title by a margin of only one point during the previous year's finals.

Coach Peping Yee used only eight men — Arturo Valenzona, Romy Diaz, Rohimust Santos, Oscar Lopez, Domiciano and Alberto Legaspi, Josefino Roa, and season MVP Joselino Roa — in fashioning out the easy vengeance win.

The Tamaraws outdueled the Warriors in a frenzied shooting battle to take the halftime lead, 51–37. An air-tight zone defense rattled UE throughout and a brilliant teamwork, spearheaded by Arturo Valenzona who tallied 32 points, spelled the victory for FEU.

References

External links
www.gameface.ph@Bounce Past

24
1961 in Philippine basketball